Rashid Bakr may refer to:

 Rashid Bakr (musician) (born 1943), American free jazz drummer
 Rashid Bakr (politician) (1933–1988), Sudanese politician